The 1993–94 NBA season was the 48th season of the National Basketball Association. The season ended with the Houston Rockets defeating the New York Knicks 4 games to 3 in the NBA Finals to win the franchise's first championship.

Notable occurrences

The Orlando Magic became the first team to earn the top overall pick in consecutive years in the Lottery Era. Orlando drafted Chris Webber in the 1993 NBA draft, only to trade him to the Golden State Warriors for Penny Hardaway and three future first round picks. Webber would win Rookie of the Year this season, while Hardaway was the runner-up. 
A press conference was held on October 6, 1993. One month before the start of the season, Michael Jordan shocked the world by announcing his retirement from the NBA following the death of his father.  Jordan would not be back on the court until March 1995.
The Chicago Bulls played their final season at Chicago Stadium.
The Cleveland Cavaliers played their final season at Richfield Coliseum.
The San Antonio Spurs played their first season at the Alamodome.
The Atlanta Hawks traded All-Star forward Dominique Wilkins to the Los Angeles Clippers for Danny Manning midway through the season. As of 2020, the Hawks became the first and only #1 seed to trade their scoring leader during the regular season.
The Dallas Mavericks almost became the first team to lose 70 or more games in consecutive seasons. They finished with a dreadful 13–69 record.
Isiah Thomas of the Detroit Pistons suffered a torn Achilles tendon in a game against the Orlando Magic in April, which led to his retirement from the NBA. Just a few months prior, teammate Bill Laimbeer announced his retirement, citing a lack of desire to play. Their retirements came a season before  Grant Hill's arrival the next season. 
Dennis Rodman, another star player from Detroit's Bad Boys era, was traded to the San Antonio Spurs for Sean Elliott, and began to sport his trademark colored hair. However, Elliott was eventually traded back to the Spurs, where he'd play the rest of his career.
Laker legend Magic Johnson tried his hand at coaching, but the Lakers missed the playoffs for just the fourth time in NBA history (and the first time since 1976) and Johnson refused to come back for the 1994–95 season; both L.A. based teams post a collective mark of 60–104, marking the first time both the Lakers and Clippers missed the playoffs together since the latter team's arrival in Los Angeles in 1984. 
The Houston Rockets tied a record set in 1948 by the Washington Capitols in starting the season with 15 victories; they started the season 22–1 before finishing with a 58–24 record.
On February 17, David Robinson of the San Antonio Spurs recorded the NBA's 4th quadruple-double (34 points, 10 each rebounds, assists, and blocks) in a home game against the Detroit Pistons.  This is the last time a quadruple-double was made in an NBA game.
The 1994 NBA All-Star Game was played at the Target Center in Minneapolis, Minnesota, with the East defeating the West 127–118. Scottie Pippen of the Chicago Bulls took home the game's MVP honors.
On the season's final day, Spurs center David Robinson scored 71 points against the Los Angeles Clippers to capture the scoring title.
In the wake of the Northridge earthquake, the game between Sacramento Kings and Los Angeles Lakers was postponed and rescheduled.
Reggie Miller of the Indiana Pacers became just the third member of the 50–40–90 Club by shooting 50% from the field, 42% from three, and 91% from the line for the course of the entire season.  Only Larry Bird and Mark Price had achieved this feat at that time; only Steve Nash, Dirk Nowitzki, Kevin Durant, Stephen Curry, Malcolm Brogdon, and Kyrie Irving have achieved it since.
The Denver Nuggets made NBA Playoff history by becoming the first eight-seed to defeat a one-seed in the first round of a playoff series when they defeated the Seattle SuperSonics 3 games to 2.
The Indiana Pacers won their first NBA playoff series by sweeping the Orlando Magic, who were making their playoff debut. The Pacers would go on to their first Eastern Conference Finals, eventually losing to the New York Knicks in seven games.
The New York Knicks came one game away from playing the maximum number of playoff contests. Had the New Jersey Nets captured one more victory over them in the first round, this would have been done as the Knicks played seven-game series in the next three rounds against the Bulls, Pacers, and Rockets. The Boston Celtics would later exceed the mark in 2008.
This year's NBA Finals would be the last to go seven games until 2005. This was also the only year in which both the NBA Finals and the Stanley Cup Finals would go to seven games and involve teams from the same city. Although the Knicks lost the NBA Finals, the Rangers (their NHL counterparts) won their first Stanley Cup since .
Neither the Los Angeles Lakers nor the Boston Celtics made the playoffs, making this the only season in NBA history until 2014 that neither of these teams had qualified.

1993–94 NBA changes
 The Denver Nuggets changed their logo and uniforms, scrapping the rainbow skyline along with changing the color scheme to navy, red, and gold.
 The Milwaukee Bucks changed their logo and uniforms, adopting a new color scheme of purple to go with dark green, while their uniforms featured taller B's and S's on the home and road jerseys.
 The San Antonio Spurs moved into the Alamodome.

Standings

By division

By conference

Notes
z – Clinched home court advantage for the entire playoffs
c – Clinched home court advantage for the conference playoffs
y – Clinched division title 
x – Clinched playoff spot

Playoffs
Teams in bold advanced to the next round. The numbers to the left of each team indicate the team's seeding in its conference, and the numbers to the right indicate the number of games the team won in that round. The division champions are marked by an asterisk. Home court advantage does not necessarily belong to the higher-seeded team, but instead the team with the better regular season record; teams enjoying the home advantage are shown in italics.

Statistics leaders

NBA awards
Most Valuable Player: Hakeem Olajuwon, Houston Rockets
Rookie of the Year: Chris Webber, Golden State Warriors
Defensive Player of the Year: Hakeem Olajuwon, Houston Rockets
Sixth Man of the Year: Dell Curry, Charlotte Hornets
Most Improved Player: Don MacLean, Washington Bullets
Coach of the Year: Lenny Wilkens, Atlanta Hawks

All-NBA First Team:
F – Karl Malone, Utah Jazz
F – Scottie Pippen, Chicago Bulls
C – Hakeem Olajuwon, Houston Rockets
G – John Stockton, Utah Jazz
G – Latrell Sprewell, Golden State Warriors

 All-NBA Second Team:
F – Shawn Kemp, Seattle SuperSonics 
F – Charles Barkley, Phoenix Suns
C – David Robinson, San Antonio Spurs
G – Mitch Richmond, Sacramento Kings
G – Kevin Johnson, Phoenix Suns

 All-NBA Third Team:
F – Derrick Coleman, New Jersey Nets
F – Dominique Wilkins, Atlanta Hawks / Los Angeles Clippers
C – Shaquille O'Neal, Orlando Magic
G – Mark Price, Cleveland Cavaliers
G – Gary Payton, Seattle SuperSonics

 NBA All-Defensive First Team:
F – Charles Oakley, New York Knicks
F – Scottie Pippen, Chicago Bulls
C – Hakeem Olajuwon, Houston Rockets
G – Mookie Blaylock, Atlanta Hawks
G – Gary Payton, Seattle SuperSonics

 NBA All-Defensive Second Team:
F – Dennis Rodman, San Antonio Spurs
F – Horace Grant, Chicago Bulls
C – David Robinson, San Antonio Spurs
G – Latrell Sprewell, Golden State Warriors
G – Nate McMillan, Seattle SuperSonics

NBA All-Rookie First Team:
Isaiah Rider, Minnesota Timberwolves
Penny Hardaway, Orlando Magic
Chris Webber, Golden State Warriors
Jamal Mashburn, Dallas Mavericks
Vin Baker, Milwaukee Bucks

NBA All-Rookie Second Team:
Dino Rađja, Boston Celtics
Toni Kukoč, Chicago Bulls
Shawn Bradley, Philadelphia 76ers
Lindsey Hunter, Detroit Pistons
Nick Van Exel, Los Angeles Lakers

References

 
 
1994 in American sports